Clermontville is an unincorporated community in Clermont County, in the U.S. state of Ohio.

History
Clermontville was settled before 1815 and the hamlet once contained a sawmill and school, the Clermont Academy. A post office called Clermontville was established in 1875 and remained in operation until 1912.

References

Unincorporated communities in Clermont County, Ohio
Unincorporated communities in Ohio